

First round selections

The following are the first round picks in the 1970 Major League Baseball draft.

* Did not sign

Other notable selections 

* Did not sign

References

External links 
Complete draft list from The Baseball Cube database

References 

Draft
Major League Baseball draft